The 1916 United States presidential election in Connecticut  took place on November 7, 1916, as part of the 1916 United States presidential election which was held throughout all contemporary 48 states. Voters chose seven representatives, or electors to the Electoral College, who voted for president and vice president. 

Connecticut was won by the Republican nominee, U.S. Supreme Court Justice Charles Evans Hughes of New York, and his running mate Senator Charles W. Fairbanks of Indiana. They defeated Democratic nominees, incumbent Democratic President Woodrow Wilson and Vice President Thomas R. Marshall. 

Hughes won Connecticut by a narrow margin of 3.14%.

Results

Results by town

See also
 United States presidential elections in Connecticut

References

Connecticut
1916
1916 Connecticut elections